GNWR may refer to:

Genesee and Wyoming Railroad - former American railroad with GNWR reporting mark
Great North Western Railway - working name for train services in England that will be operated by Grand Central